Mario Antonio Salgado Jiménez  (born 3 June 1981) is a Chilean retired footballer.

Salgado formerly played at Huachipato in Chile and then moved to Italy with Brescia Calcio and remained during several years at other clubs of Europe. In February 2011, the striker returned to his country for play in Colo-Colo.

Club career

Brescia Calcio
Salgado joined Brescia Calcio from Huachipato in July 2001. He became the teammate of Roberto Baggio, an Italian historic footballer. His Serie A debut came on 16 September against Lecce, in a 1–1 draw.

With Brescia, Salgado scored 1 goal in 18 appearances. He later was loaned to Serie B side Hellas Verona in 2003, remaining one season there.

Extensive career at Italy
In July 2003, was confirmed that Salgado moved to Austrian Bundesliga side SV Salzburg, one of the most recognized teams of Austria. However, he had a bad spell at Salzburg and was loaned to Ternana, in where was teammate of his countrymen Luis Jimenez, and shortly after was loaned to AlbinoLeffe in 2006. After his loan spell at AlbinoLeffe, his contract with Salzburg (now called Red Bull Salzburg) expired, not was renewed and was released of that team.

In the European summer winter of 2006, he was signed by Foggia of the Serie C1. In summer 2007, he joined to the recently promoted team to Serie B, Avellino in joint-ownership bid.

After his successful seasons at Avellino, he returned to Foggia, where he also had a good season, scoring 15 goals in 38 appearances. His good performances' for Foggia and Avellino attracted the attention of Torino and joined the Serie B club in a co-ownership deal. However, he had a regular season at Torino, only scoring 1 goal during 9 appearances (six games in Serie B and three in the promotion playoffs). On 3 January 2011, the club's directive terminated his contract.

Colo-Colo
In December 2010, Salgado moved to Primera A side Colo-Colo, on a one-year deal.

He made his debut in a 1–0 loss against Deportes La Serena for a pre-season friendly. The veteran striker of the Italian football, had a poor semester, and for this reason, he and his teammate Agustín Alayes were fired, but Salgado had a second opportunity in the most successful club of Chile, during the delay of the negotiations for release to Salgado of the club.

International career
He capped for U-20 side in 2001 FIFA World Youth Championship in Argentina.

Coaching career
He began his coaching career at the Tercera B, the fifth level of the Chilean football league system, with the clubs  and Corporación Lota. For the 2019 season, he signed with Independiente de Cauquenes in the Segunda División Profesional de Chile, but he left the team in March 2019. In 2021, he joined Lota Schwager.

References

External links
 
 

1981 births
Living people
People from Talcahuano
Chilean footballers
Chile under-20 international footballers
Chilean expatriate footballers
C.D. Huachipato footballers
Brescia Calcio players
Hellas Verona F.C. players
FC Red Bull Salzburg players
Ternana Calcio players
U.C. AlbinoLeffe players
Calcio Foggia 1920 players
U.S. Avellino 1912 players
Torino F.C. players
Colo-Colo footballers
Deportes La Serena footballers
Naval de Talcahuano footballers
Coquimbo Unido footballers
Serie A players
Serie B players
Serie C players
Chilean Primera División players
Primera B de Chile players
Segunda División Profesional de Chile players
Austrian Football Bundesliga players
Association football forwards
Chilean expatriate sportspeople in Italy
Chilean expatriate sportspeople in Austria
Expatriate footballers in Italy
Expatriate footballers in Austria
Chilean football managers
Lota Schwager managers
Segunda División Profesional de Chile managers